Siyob Bazaar , also called Siab Bazaar, is the largest bazaar in Samarkand, Uzbekistan. All daily necessities, such as "Samarkand naan", are sold.

Siyob Bazaar is located adjacent to the Bibi-Khanym Mosque, and is visited not only by local people but also by domestic and foreign tourists.

See also
 Bazaar
 Bazaars in Uzbekistan
 Chorsu Bazaar (Tashkent)
 Chorsu (Samarkand)
 Market (place)
 Retail

References

Bazaars
Buildings and structures in Samarkand
Retail markets in Uzbekistan